The Lost City is an independently made 12 chapter science fiction film serial created and produced in 1935 by Sherman S. Krellberg and directed by Harry Revier.

Plot
Scientist Bruce Gordon comes to a secluded area in Africa after concluding that a series of electrically induced natural disasters had originated from in the area.  There he finds the crazed Zolok, last of the Lemurians, in a secret complex inside a mountain.

Zolok had created the natural disasters as a prelude to his attempt to take over the world, holding a brilliant scientist, Dr. Manyus, there hostage, along with his daughter, Natcha. He had forced Manyus to create mindless "giant" slaves out of the natives as a private army and as the serial progresses we learn Manyus also turned another tribe, the spider-worshipping Wangas, into thin, impotent whites. Gordon helps Manyus and his daughter to escape Zolok, but they encounter Ben Ali, a malignant slave trader; meet the sexy native Queen Rama, who tries to help them; and survive harrowing jungle adventures before returning to the Lost City and stopping Zolok's plan.

Cast 
William "Stage" Boyd as Zolok
Kane Richmond as Bruce Gordon
Claudia Dell as Natcha Manyus
Josef Swickard as Dr. Manyus
Eddie Fetherston as Jerry Delaney
George F. Hayes as Butterfield
Billy Bletcher as Gorzo
Jerry Frank as Apollon
Gino Corrado as Ben Ali
Margot D'Use as Queen Rama
 Sam Baker as Hugo.

Chapter titles

"Living Dead-Men" (27 min, 51 s)
"The Tunnel of Flame" (20 min, 42 s)
"Dagger Rock" (19 min, 52 s)
"Doomed" (18 min,  30 s)
"Tiger Prey" (19 min,  31 s)
"Human Beasts" (18 min, 25 s)
"Spider Men" (17 min, 4 s)
"Human Targets" (17 min, 36 s)
"Jungle Vengeance" (23 min, 4 s)
"The Lion Pit" (18 min, 21 s)
"Death Ray" (20 min, 31 s)
"The Mad Scientist" (18 min, 23 s)
Source:

Production
The film took the  premise of that year's The Phantom Empire but transferred the lost civilization motif from the west to another popular serial locale, the African jungle.

Feature-length versions
Sherman S. Krellberg had the serial edited into four different feature versions over time, perhaps setting a record for feature versions of a serial.  The first feature consisted of the first three episodes of the serial and the first reel of the fourth episode edited together, and supplemented with footage not part of the serial itself which drew the adventure to a loose conclusion; and the second was compiled from material in the first and last four chapters of the serial, omitting the adventures with the slave traders, the spider people and Queen Rama, but ending as did the serial.  Both these features were made and released in 1935 and both were also called The Lost City.  The first of these was also designed so that it could be followed over successive weeks by the remaining chapters in the serial.

In the early '40s Krellberg created a new feature version that incorporated material from the adventures with the slavers, spider people and jungle queen, and released this under the title City of Lost Men.  Finally, in the 1970s, he took the first feature version and clumsily edited in, at the end, most of the footage from the last chapter, creating what goes beyond a continuity gap and is rather a continuity abyss, and attached the City of Lost Men title to this feature.

It's not clear whether the last feature had an actual theatrical release or went directly to television.  The first City of Lost Men appears to be lost, and videos and DVDs being sold under that title are sourced from film prints of this final feature.  Since it incorporates the entire first feature version entitled Lost City, that film cannot fairly be said to be lost, although no separate video issue of that version under its own titles, is known.  Video/DVD offerings of The Lost City as a feature are from prints of the second feature version described.

See also 
 List of film serials
 List of film serials by studio
 List of films in the public domain in the United States

References

External links 
 
 
 Dr Hermes Review of The Lost City (archived)
Collection of movie posters

Download or view online
Complete public domain serial at The Internet Archive

Chapter 1 at The Internet Archive
Chapter 2 at The Internet Archive
Chapter 3 at The Internet Archive
Chapter 4 at The Internet Archive

Chapter 5 at The Internet Archive
Chapter 6 at The Internet Archive
Chapter 7 at The Internet Archive
Chapter 8 at The Internet Archive

Chapter 9 at The Internet Archive
Chapter 10 at The Internet Archive
Chapter 11 at The Internet Archive
Chapter 12 at The Internet Archive

Lemuria (continent) in fiction
Film serials
Jungle girls
1935 films
1930s fantasy adventure films
1930s English-language films
1930s independent films
American black-and-white films
American independent films
Films directed by Harry Revier
Films set in Africa
Lost world films
American science fiction films
1930s science fiction films
American fantasy adventure films
1930s American films